Grace White may refer to:

Grace White (1660–1740), Colonial American convicted for witchcraft in Virginia; married name Grace Sherwood
Grace White, English publisher of York Mercury in 1719 (Timeline of York#18th century)
Grace Miller White (1868–1957), American romance novelist (Tess of the Storm Country)
E. Grace White (1890–1975), American ichthyologist, zoologist, author and academic
Grace White, American lawyer in 1937 (List of first women lawyers and judges in South Carolina#Beaufort County)
Grace White, British Personal Assistant to the Secretary (1993 New Year Honours#British Empire Medal (BEM)#United Kingdom)
Bethany Grace White, English illustrator and designer (As You Are (album)#Title and artwork) 2014
Grace White, American musician and songwriter; member of 2011 duo Grace & Tony
Grace White, American college basketball forward (2018–19 Denver Pioneers women's basketball team#Roster)
Grace White, American college basketball guard (2018–19 Northern Kentucky Norse women's basketball team#Roster)